Tương Dương is a rural district of Nghệ An province, in the North Central Coast region of Vietnam. As of 2018 the district had a population of 83,640. The district covers an area of 2,811.92 km². The district capital lies at Thạch Giám township.

References

Districts of Nghệ An province